This is a list of airlines that have operated the McDonnell Douglas MD-90.

Major airlines that have operated the MD-90 include Delta Air Lines, Saudi Arabian Airlines, Japan Airlines, and UNI Air.

Former operators

Reno Air operated five MD-90 aircraft as a part of its McDonnell Douglas jetliner fleet, which were subsequently operated by American Airlines following their acquisition of Reno Air in 1999. These aircraft were then removed from the American fleet and sold to Lion Air, with two eventually being purchased by Delta as spare parts aircraft.

U.S. based start-up air carrier Pro Air ordered the MD-90 but did not operate the aircraft prior to ceasing operations and going out of business.

Alaska Airlines considered ordering the MD-90 but did not take delivery of the type or operate the aircraft and none were manufactured for the airline.

Notes

References

MD-90
McDonnell Douglas MD-90